The 2006 United States Senate election in Maine was held November 7, 2006. Incumbent Republican Olympia Snowe won re-election to a third term. , this was the last time Republicans won the Class 1 U.S. Senate seat in Maine.

Candidates

Democratic 
 Jean Hay Bright, activist

Independent 
 Bill Slavick, activist

Republican 
 Olympia Snowe, incumbent U.S. Senator

Campaign 
Snowe, who had been elected to both of her previous terms by approximately 2 to 1 margins, had never lost an election. Her success is accredited to her centrist Republican ideology, which resulted in high approval ratings. Meanwhile, her Democratic opponent in the 2006 election, Jean Hay Bright, had never been elected to political office.

Democrats' best hope for taking the seat was that Snowe would retire rather than run in 2006, but there was never any indication that Snowe seriously considered not running for re-election.

The filing deadline for major party candidates was March 15, 2006. The primary was held June 13, 2006. Olympia Snowe was unopposed for the Republican nomination; Jean Hay Bright narrowly won the Democratic nod with 50.7% of the vote against Eric Mehnert.

Hay Bright announced her candidacy in May 2005. Hay Bright was previously an unsuccessful candidate for the Democratic nomination to the House in 1994 and the Senate in 1996. 

The race had been called by FOX News for the Republican incumbent Olympia Snowe 23 minutes after the polls had closed. Snowe won re-election by a greater margin than any U.S. Senator that cycle except Indiana's Richard Lugar, who faced only a Libertarian opponent.

Polling

Predictions

Results 

Snowe won in all of Maine's counties, taking at least 60% of the vote in each region.

See also 
 2006 United States Senate elections

References

External links 
 Snowe's campaign website
 Hay Bright's campaign website
 Mehnert's campaign website
 Slavick's campaign website

Maine
2006
2006 Maine elections